The International League Pitcher of the Year Award is an annual award given to the best pitcher in Minor League Baseball's International League based on their regular-season performance as voted on by league managers. Broadcasters, Minor League Baseball executives, members of the media, coaches, and other representatives from the league's clubs have previously voted as well. Though the circuit was founded in 1884, it did not become known as the International League on a consistent basis until 1912. The first Most Valuable Pitcher Award, as it was originally known, was not issued until 1953. After the cancellation of the 2020 season, the league was called the Triple-A East in 2021 before reverting to the International League name in 2022. The award became known as the Pitcher of the Year Award in 2021.

From 1932 to 1952, pitchers were eligible to win the International League Most Valuable Player Award (MVP) as no award was designated for pitchers. Four pitchers won the MVP Award: Mike Ryba (1940), Fred Hutchinson (1941), Red Barrett (1942), and Tom Poholsky (1950). Nine pitchers have also won the league's Top MLB Prospect Award (formerly the Rookie of the Year Award): Bob Trice (1953), Jim Owens (1954), Fred Kipp (1956), Walt Craddock (1957), Jason Isringhausen (1995), Brian Rose (1997), Brandon Duckworth (2001), Francisco Liriano (2005), and Julio Teherán (2011). Trice, Isringhausen, Rose, Duckworth, and Teherán each won the Most Valuable Pitcher and Rookie of the Year Awards in the same season.

Seven players from the Pawtucket Red Sox and Rochester Red Wings have each been selected for the Pitcher of the Year Award, more than any other teams in the league, followed by the Columbus Clippers, Norfolk Tides, and Syracuse Mets (6); the Indianapolis Indians and Toronto Maple Leafs (5); the Lehigh Valley IronPigs (4); the Charlotte Knights, Columbus Jets, and Scranton/Wilkes-Barre RailRiders (3); the Durham Bulls, Richmond Braves, Richmond Virginians, and Toledo Mud Hens (2); and the Charleston Charlies, Gwinnett Stripers, Jacksonville Jumbo Shrimp, Louisville Bats, Montreal Royals, Omaha Storm Chasers, and Ottawa Athletics (1).

Twelve players from the New York Yankees Major League Baseball (MLB) organization have won the award, more than any other, followed by the Boston Red Sox organization (8); the Pittsburgh Pirates organization (7); the New York Mets and Philadelphia Phillies organizations (6); the Baltimore Orioles organization (5); the Chicago White Sox organization (4); the Atlanta Braves and Toronto Blue Jays organizations (3); the Cleveland Guardians, Minnesota Twins, and Tampa Bay Rays organizations (2); and the Cincinnati Reds, Detroit Tigers, Kansas City Royals, Los Angeles Dodgers, Milwaukee Brewers, Oakland Athletics, and St. Louis Cardinals organizations (1). Three award winners played for teams that were not affiliated with any MLB organization.

Winners

Wins by team

Active International League teams appear in bold.

Wins by organization

Active International League–Major League Baseball affiliations appear in bold.

Notes

References
Specific

General

Awards established in 1953
Most Valuable Pitcher Award
Minor league baseball trophies and awards